Jan Kopecký (born 28 January 1982) is a professional rally driver from Czech Republic who drives for Škoda Motorsport. He is the 2013 ERC champion, 2018 WRC-2 champion as well as a multiple champion of the Czech Rally Championship

Career

After beginning his career as a circuit touring cars driver, Kopecký changed to rallysport in 2001, winning the national sprintrally championships at first. In 2004 he won the national classical rally championships and entered the world championships next year.

In the 2006 World Rally Championship season he competed with co-driver Filip Schovánek driving a Škoda Fabia WRC. Kopecký won 3 Special Stages, SS18 at the 2006 Rally d'Italia Sardegna and SS9 and SS14 at the 2006 Rallye Deutschland. His best finish was 5th place at the 2006 Rally Catalunya, he scored 7 points and 15th position.

In 2007, he continued competing with the Fabia and placed 12th in the drivers' world championship. His best finish was 5th place at the 2007 Rallye Deutschland, he scored more points than in 2006, 10 points and 12th position.

In 2008 Kopecký entered Rally México with Fiat Grande Punto Abarth S2000 but retired at 2nd special stage. After that he switched to Peugeot 207 S2000 and Intercontinental Rally Challenge. His best result was 2nd place at the Rally Portugal and after Rally Russia he was hired by Škoda Motorsport and started testing Škoda Fabia S2000.

Kopecký competed in the Intercontinental Rally Challenge with a works Škoda Fabia Super 2000 finishing second in the championship and winning two events, the Rally Principe de Asturias and Barum Czech Rally Zlín, making him the first Czech driver to win the rally in a Czech car. Kris Meeke became champion with Peugeot 207 S2000 in 2009.

In 2010 Kopecký continued his relationship with Škoda and also with his good performance in IRC. He won Rally Islas Canarias and finished 2nd at Ypres Rally and at Rali Vinho da Madeira but he also twice retired from 1st position almost at the end of rally. It was at Rally Azores and at Barum Rally Zlín. Kopecký was again 2nd in drivers standings, this time Juho Hänninen, 2nd factory driver of Škoda Motorsport was champion.

In 2011 Kopecký was entered by Škoda Motorsport at the 2011 Monte Carlo Rally alongside of Freddy Loix, Juho Hänninen and Nicolas Vouilloz.In 2021 he entered to the Hungarian Rally Championship with a Skoda Fabia Rally2 Evo under the Topp Cars Rally Team alongside the Czech Championship .

Results

WRC results
 
* Season still in progress.

WRC-2 results

WRC-2 Pro results

IRC results

ERC results

* Season still in progress.

Czech Rally Championship results

* Season still in progress.

References

External links

IRC Official Site
Jan Kopecký – profile at ewrc-results.com

1982 births
Living people
Czech rally drivers
Intercontinental Rally Challenge drivers
European Rally Championship drivers
World Rally Championship drivers
People from Opočno
Sportspeople from the Hradec Králové Region
Toksport WRT drivers
Škoda Motorsport drivers